New Morals for Old is a 1932 American pre-Code romance-drama film produced and distributed by MGM. It is based on the 1931 Broadway play After All, in which Humphrey Bogart had a significant role. Bogart's stage role is portrayed by David Newell in the film.

The film is noteworthy for having elements that would later be forbidden under the Motion Picture Production Code. There is very brief nudity, albeit in shadows and by a non-speaking character (the model in the painters' studio).  Also, one of the female characters is in a relationship with a married man, and this is portrayed sympathetically.

Plot
Mr. and Mrs. Thomas are affluent New Yorkers who are unhappy that their adult children, Ralph Thomas (Robert Young) and Phyl Thomas (Margaret Perry), spend so many evenings at parties instead of spending time with family.  Their disapproval deepens when they discover both children want to move out to pursue lifestyles that the parents deem unacceptable: Phyl moves into her own apartment so that she can conduct an affair with a married man, Duff Wilson (David Newell). Her brother, Ralph, goes to Paris to pursue his dream of being a painter, thus disappointing his father who expected him to remain in the family wallpaper business. Mrs. Thomas repeatedly tries to invoke guilt in both children for not being with her, especially after Mr. Thomas dies of a stroke.

Eventually, Phyl marries her paramour and Ralph returns to New York, having failed as an artist. Mrs. Thomas dies shortly after Ralph's return. At the end of the film, Phyl, her twin infants, her husband Duff, and her brother Ralph are all living in the family home, with a newfound appreciation for the benefits of family life. In the film's last scene, Ralph and Duff are laughing together about how Phyl has evolved into a protective maternal figure, much like her own mother.

Cast
 Robert Young as Ralph Thomas
 Margaret Perry as Phyl Thomas
 Lewis Stone as Mr. Thomas
 Laura Hope Crews as Mrs. Thomas
 Myrna Loy as Myra
 David Newell as Duff Wilson
 Jean Hersholt as James Hallett
 Ruth Selwyn as Estelle
 Kathryn Crawford as Zoe Atkinson
 Louise Closser Hale as Mrs. Warburton
 Mitchell Lewis as Bodwin
 Elizabeth Patterson as Aunty Doe

Home media
New Morals for Old was released on DVD by the Warner Archive Collection. Laura Hope Crews's name is misspelled in MGM's original poster advertising and the film's opening credits.

References

External links
 
 
 
 

1932 films
1932 romantic drama films
American romantic drama films
American black-and-white films
American films based on plays
Films directed by Charles Brabin
Metro-Goldwyn-Mayer films
Films produced by Harry Rapf
1930s American films